Vojislav "Đedo" Kecmanović (1881 – 25 March 1961) was a Serb doctor who participated in the Balkan Wars and the National Liberation Struggle. He was the first President of the Presidium of the People's Assembly of PR Bosnia and Herzegovina and was also president of ZAVNOBiH.

Early life and education
Kecmanović was born in Čitluk, near Prijedor, in 1881. He attended high school in Sarajevo, Reljevo and Karlowitz. He studied medicine from 1905 to 1911 in Prague where he graduated. While working as a doctor in Tuzla during the Balkan Wars, ha crossed into the Kingdom of Serbia and participated in it as a volunteer.

Career
After the Balkan Wars, Kecmanović returned to Tuzla, and then lived in Sarajevo. In Banja Luka, he was sentenced to five years in prison for high-treason process, serving his sentence in Banja Luka and Zenica. In 1918, he was a doctor in Bijeljina. Kecmanović was president of the cultural-educational societies and reading rooms "Filip Višnjić" and was also a distinguished cultural worker. In 1943, he was elected member of the Anti-Fascist Council for the National Liberation of Yugoslavia and also became president of ZAVNOBiH, the highest governing organ of the anti-fascist movement in Bosnia and Herzegovina and during World War II developed to be the bearer of Bosnian statehood.

From 26 April 1945 to November 1946, Kecmanović was the first President of the Presidium of the People's Assembly of PR Bosnia and Herzegovina.

Death
Kecmanović died on 25 March 1961 in Sarajevo, PR Bosnia and Herzegovina, FPR Yugoslavia.

External links

1881 births
1961 deaths
Chairmen of the Presidency of Bosnia and Herzegovina